The sixth season of the television series, Law & Order: Special Victims Unit premiered September 21, 2004 and ended May 24, 2005 on NBC. It aired on Tuesday nights at 10pm/9c. In January 2005, when the season was halfway through airing, Mariska Hargitay won the Golden Globe Award for Best Actress – Television Series Drama becoming the first regular cast member of any Law & Order series to win a Golden Globe.

Production
Emmy Ann Wooding, a long time assistant at Wolf Films, died in a car accident while the sixth season was being filmed. The seventh episode "Charisma" was dedicated to her memory. Towards the end of the season, Law & Order: Special Victims Unit crossed over with the third Law & Order franchise spin-off, Law & Order: Trial by Jury with two episodes: "Night" in SVU and "Day" in TBJ. In the episode, Casey Novak is beaten unconscious by an Islamic fundamentalist. In an interview for USA Network, Diane Neal, who did her own stunts, revealed that she passed out due to an error in how they acted out the scene.

In an interview about Season 6, Mariska Hargitay mentioned that filming of the night time scenes took place on Tuesday and Friday nights, when finished episodes were airing. The same interview explained how she provided input to the writing of the episode "Doubt". Hargitay, who is a trained rape crisis counselor, said: "I made Neal take a tour of the rape treatment center. Because once I became a counselor I could say, 'No, this isn't how we do it.'" "Doubt", which is noted for not revealing the jury's verdict, focused on a student and her professor and the difficulty in determining whether their encounter was rape or consensual sex. NBC conducted an online poll, which revealed that 60% of the viewers were in favor of a "not guilty" verdict. Filming of the episode ran long because of a truck that would not start. According to producer Gail Barringer, "It was at night and we had a long delay, we went really late. It's the worst feeling to keep looking at your watch. We want it all to be perfect, but your watch just screams at you."

During the sixth season, sound mixer Bill Daly, who had been with the show since its inception, elaborated on the audio equipment used by SVU. This included Lectrosonics receivers and interruptible foldbacks set up so that everything was wireless.

Cast changes and returning characters
All main cast members present at the end of the fifth season returned for the sixth. Stephanie March, who left the show early in Season 5, returned as Alexandra Cabot in the sixteenth episode "Ghost".

In the episode "Outcry", John Schuck played the NYPD's Chief of Detectives which became a recurring part. The episodes "Weak", "Contagious" and "Identity" starred Mary Stuart Masterson as Dr. Rebecca Hendrix, a psychiatrist and former cop. This gave Masterson what has been called her best known role. After confirming that Hendrix was needed while BD Wong was acting in theatre, Neal Baer stated that the character also gave him an opportunity to introduce a conflict between Benson and Stabler and said "Stabler hasn't always felt warmly toward psychiatry, but he does warm up to this character - who has been both a cop and a shrink." The character Dr. Amy Solwey from the fifth season returned in the episode "Parts". Played by Marlee Matlin, Neal Baer said "Munch got very involved with her character, and we thought, Wow, that's really moving‚ let's bring her back."

Cast

Main cast
 Christopher Meloni as Det. Elliot Stabler
 Mariska Hargitay as Det. Olivia Benson
 Richard Belzer as Det. John Munch
 Diane Neal as ADA Casey Novak
 Ice-T as Det. Fin Tutuola
 BD Wong as Dr. George Huang 
 Dann Florek as Capt. Don Cragen

Special guest star
 Stephanie March as ADA Alexandra Cabot

Crossover stars
 Fred Dalton Thompson as DA Arthur Branch (crossing over with Law & Order and Law & Order: Trial by Jury)
 Bebe Neuwirth as Homicide Bureau Chief DA Tracey Kibre (crossing over with Law & Order: Trial by Jury)

Recurring cast

Guest stars

In the season premiere "Birthright", Lea Thompson starred as a mother who lets her maternal instincts go out of control. Her character arranged for the kidnapping of a girl played by Abigail Breslin. Neal Baer opined in an interview that "The premiere with Lea Thompson really moved people." In the same interview, Baer said "The one with Ming Na was beautifully made. It gave you a sense of Chinatown that you don't usually see on TV." In "Debt", Ming-Na played a woman who gets in over her head with a Chinese gang specializing in smuggling and extortion.

The third episode "Obscene" starred Lewis Black as a shock jock whose right to free speech comes under attack. This is prompted by an overprotective mother played by Dana Delany. SVU writers had been asking Delany to do a show for years and wrote the part with her in mind. According to Delany, "It deals with First Amendment rights and a Howard Stern type character. I think it presents both sides of the argument well." Kyle MacLachlan starred in the episode "Conscience" as a grieving father who notices an opportunity to eliminate a sociopath. MacLachlan later pointed out "I took matters into my own hands and actually got away with it which was one of the few times on SVU that that happens."

The episode "Charisma" saw Jeff Kober play a lying and manipulative cult leader. Mariska Hargitay described his character as "The most charismatic, genius-like serial-killer-cult-leader that doesn't think he's doing anything wrong." For her performance in "Weak", Amanda Plummer won the Primetime Emmy Award for Outstanding Guest Actress in a Drama Series. Plummer played Miranda Cole, a paranoid schizophrenic who struggles to recount the details of her rape. Dallas Roberts (who would later guest star as Dr. Gregory Yates in Season 16 and Season 17) played her attacker. In "Contagious", child actress Jennette McCurdy played Holly Purcell, a traumatized nine-year-old rape victim. For an interview in 2008, McCurdy wrote "My favorite job to this day has been Law and Order: SVU. I played a girl who had been badly abused, so the part involved lots of crying and seriousness."

In "Haunted", Ernest Waddell made his first of what would become several appearances as Fin Tutuola's son Ken Randall. The character had been mentioned in previous seasons but never shown. Neal Baer stated that the plan to reveal family members slowly was intentional with "We like revealing those kinds of things about a character - as you would in any workplace where you know the people. You work with them, they're your 'workplace family', but you may not know about other details until issues come up that reveal those details." This episode was referenced in an interview with Ice T who said "When you add children to it, Fin kind of softens up." In "Rage", Matthew Modine portrayed Gordon Rickett, a serial killer who shares a history with Detective Stabler. When announcing the episode, Neal Baer said that Stabler "must now confront his own built up rage, before it leads to tragedy." 

Marlee Matlin reprised her role from the fifth season in the episode "Parts". She praised Richard Belzer's performance for a second time and expressed excitement over being able to portray her SVU character in two seasons: "When I had heard that the producers had never brought back a perp to reprise a role, I was very honored. Amy is such a complex and troubled character and one I could easily see return." ADA Novak took on the Department of Defense in the season finale "Goliath". The incident inspiring her to do so involved an ex-military police officer played by R. E. Rogers. Rogers had previously played an ex-military character in the show's second season.

Episodes

References

Bibliography

External links
 Law & Order: Special Victims Unit Season 6 at TVGuide.com
Law & Order: Special Victims Unit Season 6 - TV IV
 Season 6 episodes at IMDb.com

06
2004 American television seasons
2005 American television seasons